Aleksandar Živanović (born 24 July 1988), is a Serbian futsal player who plays for Marbo Intermezzo and the Serbia national futsal team.

References

External links
UEFA profile

1988 births
Living people
Serbian men's futsal players